Dalğalı is a village within the municipality of Nabran, in the Khachmaz Rayon of Azerbaijan.

References

Populated places in Khachmaz District